Keynan Rew (born 2003) is an international speedway rider from Australia.

Speedway career 
In 2021, Rew helped Australia qualify for the final of the 2021 Speedway of Nations (the World team Championships of speedway). In 2022, he helped Wilki Krosno win the 2022 1.Liga.

He won the 2022 Australian Under-21 Individual Speedway Championship.

In 2023, he signed for Ipswich Witches for the SGB Premiership 2023.

References 

Living people
2003 births
Australian speedway riders
Ipswich Witches riders